The twenty-seventh season of the American animated television series The Simpsons began airing on Fox in the United States on September 27, 2015, and ended on May 22, 2016. On October 28, 2014, executive producer Al Jean announced that Season 27 went into production, renewing the series through the 2015–16 season.

The season premiere deals with Homer being diagnosed with narcolepsy, his breaking up with Marge, and falling for a pharmacist. Guest stars for this season include Blake Anderson, Kristen Bell, David Copperfield, Lena Dunham, Kelsey Grammer, Nick Kroll, Yo-Yo Ma, Edward James Olmos, Kevin Michael Richardson, and George Takei. Carl Zealer, who won a competition to be animated into The Simpsons, appeared in the episode "Halloween of Horror".

This is the last season to be produced by Film Roman and the only season not to credit Sam Simon as producer for a few episodes due to his death in 2015.

On May 14, 2015, showrunner Al Jean announced that veteran Simpsons voice actor Harry Shearer had left the show to pursue other work after his contract expired. However, on July 7, he returned to the show after signing a new deal with five other cast members.

Episodes

References

Simpsons season 27
2015 American television seasons
2016 American television seasons